The Valhalla Brewery in Unst, Shetland, Scotland, was the northernmost brewery in the United Kingdom.  It was opened by the husband and wife team Sonny and Silvia Priest in December 1997, and originally based in a large shed in Baltasound, in the centre of Unst. In 2012 the brewery moved to a building at the former RAF Saxa Vord radar station, near Haroldswick. This larger premises allowed the brewery to double production to 144,000 litres a year. 

The Brewery was named after Valhalla, the Hall of the Norse god Odin, where all fallen Viking warriors are met with a horn filled with good ale. It brewed 6 different types of beers, the first was the "Auld Rock", a dark ale brewed with malt and hops. The other types are Simmer Dim, Sjolmet Stout, White Wife, Old Scatness and the newest one Island Bere brewed from bere barley.
The brewery closed in spring 2017 due to the ill-health of the owners.

In 2018, the brewery was opened under new management in the former Olnafirth Primary School, Voe.

References

External links
Valhalla Brewery

Breweries in Scotland
Food and drink companies established in 1997
British companies established in 1997
Buildings and structures in Shetland
1997 establishments in Scotland
Companies based in Shetland
Unst